Elections were held in Metro Manila (the National Capital Region) for seats in the House of Representatives of the Philippines on May 13, 2013.

In any given district, the candidate who receives a  plurality of votes will receive that district's seat for the 16th Congress of the Philippines.

Summary

Caloocan

1st District
Incumbent Oscar Malapitan is term-limited and running for mayorship, his son Dale Gonzalo Malapitan is the party's nominee. He will face three-term mayor Enrico Echiverri.

2nd District
Mitzi Cajayon is the incumbent. She will face vice mayor Edgar Erice and former Congressman Luis Asistio.

Las Piñas
Mark Villar is the incumbent.

Makati

1st District
Monique Lagdameo is the incumbent. The district was the tightest race in 2010's legislative election, with Lagdameo enjoying a winning margin of 0.19%.

2nd District

Abigail Binay is the incumbent.

Malabon
Incumbent Josephine Lacson-Noel is running unopposed.

Mandaluyong
Neptali Gonzales II is the incumbent.

Manila

1st District
Benjamin Asilo is the incumbent.

2nd District
Carlo Lopez is the incumbent.

3rd District
Zenaida Angping is the incumbent.

4th District
Incumbent Trisha Bonoan-David is running unopposed.

5th District
Amado Bagatsing is the incumbent. His KABAKA party is affiliated with the United Nationalist Alliance.

6th District
Incumbent Rosenda Ocampo's primary opponent is Benny Abante, the erstwhile incumbent whom she defeated in 2010 by a margin of less than 2%.

Marikina

1st District

Incumbent Marcelino Teodoro is running unopposed.

2nd District

Romero Federico Quimbo is incumbent.

Muntinlupa
Rodolfo Biazon is the incumbent.

Navotas
Toby Tiangco is the incumbent. He is under Partido Navoteño, the ruling local party, which will contest this election at the banner of the United Nationalist Alliance. (He is also UNA's national secretary-general.)

Parañaque

1st District
Incumbent Edwin Olivarez is running for mayor against Benjo Bernabe; his brother Eric is his party's nominee.

2nd District
Incumbent Roilo Golez is term limited. His party nominates former mayor Joey Marquez, however he is running as independent. Marquez will be challenged by incumbent vice mayor Gustavo Tambunting.

Pasay
Imelda Calixto-Rubiano is the incumbent.

Pasig
Roman Romulo is the incumbent.

Quezon City
The second district of Quezon City was redistricted into three districts. The district that will continue to carry the "second district" name is the one surrounding the Batasang Pambansa Complex, immediately south of the La Mesa Dam watershed. The two new districts are designated as the fifth and sixth districts. The other districts  that were not affected by the redistricting (first, third and fourth) retained their nomenclatures.

1st District
Incumbent Vincent "Bingbong" Crisologo is on his last term, having served as Representative of the 1st District from 2004–2013.; his wife Rita is his party's nominee. she was lost to councilor Francisco Calalay.

2nd District
The second district of Quezon City was redistricted into three districts. The district that will continue to carry the "second district" name is the one surrounding the Batasang Pambansa Complex, immediately south of the La Mesa Dam watershed.

Winston Castelo, the incumbent 2nd district representative, is running here.

3rd District
Jorge Banal, Jr. is the incumbent, his opponent is former congressman Matias Defensor, Jr.

4th District
Feliciano Belmonte, Jr., the Speaker of the House of Representatives, is the incumbent.

5th District
The 5th district comes from old 2nd district's northernmost area, comprising most of Novaliches.

Actor and councilor Alfred Vargas won against former congresswoman Mary Ann Susano and former Congressman Dante Liban.

6th District
The 6th district comprises the old 2nd district's southernmost parts (Balintawak, Southern Portion of Novaliches and Tandang Sora areas). Lawyer Christopher "Kit" Belmonte, who ranked second to Winston Castelo in the 2010 polls), is running unopposed.

San Juan
Incumbent JV Ejercito is running for the Senate under the United Nationalist Alliance (UNA); his UNA-affiliated Partido Magdiwang nominated former representative Ronaldo Zamora as their nominee. His opponent is Councilor Jannah Ejercito, daughter of Jessie Estrada, brother of Joseph Estrada, who is Ejercito's father.

Taguig and Pateros
Taguig's 1st Sangguniang Panlungsod (SP) district and Pateros collectively elect one seat in the House of Representatives. Taguig's 2nd SP district is allocated another seat.

1st District

Arnel Cerafica is the incumbent. He will be facing off against Councilor Gigi Valenzuela de Mesa. Cerafica is also nominated by local party Kilusang Diwa ng Taguig.
 

 
 

Note: Result include Pateros.

2nd District

Sigfrido Tiñga is the incumbent but decided not to run in any position due to his personal reason.
Former Councilor Henry Duenas, Jr. will take his place to be a congressman. He will facing off against TV/Movie Director and Barangay Chairman of Fort Bonifacio Lino Edgardo S. Cayetano.

Valenzuela

First district

Incumbent Rexlon Gatchalian is running for the mayorship; his brother, Mayor Sherwin Gatchalian, is his party's nominee.

Second district

Magtanggol Gunigundo is the incumbent. He will be facing off against councilor Shalani Soledad-Romulo.

References

Metro Manila
Lower house elections in Metro Manila